This is the complete list of Asian Winter Games medalists in figure skating from 1986 to 2017.

Events

Men's singles

Women's singles

Pairs

Ice dancing

References

External links
 Figure Skating results
 1996 Results
 1999 Results
 2003 Results
 2007 Results
 2011 Results

Figure skating
medalists

Asian Games